Tomislav Havojić (born 10 March 1989 in Zagreb, SR Croatia, SFR Yugoslavia) is a Croatian professional footballer, currently playing for SK Fürstenfeld.

Club career
Havojić was a product of Dinamo Zagreb youth school, but spent four years, mostly on loan, at Lokomotiva before joining Slaven Belupo in January 2011. After having his contract with Slaven Belupo terminated in December 2011, he joined Istra 1961.

Honours
 GNK Dinamo Zagreb
 Prva HNL champions: 2006–07
 Rudeš
 2. HNL champions: 2016–17
 Lokomotiva
 3. HNL (West) champions: 2007–08
 Ferencvárosi TC
Hungarian Cup: 2014–15
Hungarian League Cup: 2014–15

Career statistics

References

External links

1989 births
Living people
Footballers from Zagreb
Association football midfielders
Croatian footballers
Croatia youth international footballers
GNK Dinamo Zagreb players
NK Lokomotiva Zagreb players
NK Slaven Belupo players
NK Istra 1961 players
Ferencvárosi TC footballers
NK Lučko players
FK Spartaks Jūrmala players
NK Rudeš players
NK Hrvatski Dragovoljac players
NK Kustošija players
Croatian Football League players
Nemzeti Bajnokság I players
First Football League (Croatia) players
Latvian Higher League players
Austrian Landesliga players
Croatian expatriate footballers
Expatriate footballers in Hungary
Croatian expatriate sportspeople in Hungary
Expatriate footballers in Latvia
Croatian expatriate sportspeople in Latvia
Expatriate footballers in Austria
Croatian expatriate sportspeople in Austria